Kurkend is a village and municipality in the Neftchala Rayon of Azerbaijan. It has a population of 1,749.

Until 15 May 2003 name of the village was Novovasilyevka. After parliament resolution of the mentioned date it was named as Kürkənd (Kurkend).

References

Populated places in Neftchala District